The men's high jump event at the 2003 IAAF World Indoor Championships was held on March 14–15.

Medalists

Results

Qualification
Qualification: Qualification Performance 2.29 (Q) or at least 8 best performers advanced to the final.

Final

References
Results

High
High jump at the World Athletics Indoor Championships